Skylab V is the fifth studio album by the Brazilian musician Rogério Skylab, the fifth in his series of ten eponymous, numbered albums. It was released in 2004 through Lobão's now-defunct label and magazine . The album is notable for its censored track "Fátima Bernardes Experiência", which was omitted in order to avoid any controversies regarding Bernardes and Glória Maria, who is also mentioned on the song's lyrics. In 2005, Skylab himself re-issued the album on a very limited run, re-introducing the censored song, and in 2023, nineteen years after Skylab Vs original release, "Fátima Bernardes Experiência" was re-issued as a single.

The album (including "Fátima Bernardes Experiência") can be downloaded for free on Skylab's official website.

Critical reception
Skylab V has been called "the quintessential Skylab album". It won the Prêmio Claro de Música Independente in the "Best MPB Album" category in 2005; it was the first (and so far only) prize Skylab won. Commenting on it he said that, "ironically, it was the most rock album [he] ever produced".

Marcelo Costa of Scream & Yell gave the album a positive rating of 8 out of 10, calling it "a classic". He, however, criticized the "last-minute" omission of the track "Fátima Bernardes Experiência" of the original release. Writing for magazine ISTOÉ, José Flávio Júnior called Skylab a "schizoid poet of the absurd [whose] poetry is highlighted by an anachronistic hard rock" and a "gratuitous provocateur". He gave the album 4 stars out of 5, but also lamented the omission of "Fátima Bernardes Experiência".

Website La Cumbuca included Skylab V in 71st place in its list of the Top 200 Brazilian Albums of the 2000s. Skylab II, IV and VII were also featured on the list, in 24th, 42nd and 110th place, respectively.

Track listing

Personnel
 Rogério Skylab – vocals, production
 Thiago Amorim – electric guitar
 Rodrigo Saci – bass guitar
 Bruno Coelho – drums
 Alexandre Guichard – classical guitar
 Vânius Marques – mixing
 Luiz Tornaghi – mastering
 Solange Venturi – photography
 Carlos Mancuso – cover art

References

2004 albums
Rogério Skylab albums
Sequel albums
Obscenity controversies in music
Albums free for download by copyright owner